Fraser John Ellis is an Australian politician. He was elected as a Liberal member of the South Australian House of Assembly at the 2018 state election, representing Narungga. On 18 February 2021, Ellis suspended his membership of the Liberal Party after being charged by the Independent Commissioner Against Corruption (ICAC) with offences relating to travel allowances.

Ellis, who qualified as a lawyer, worked as a journalist before his election.

Accommodation allowance
In June 2020, Ellis repaid $42,130 in allowances claimed for staying in Adelaide at the residence of a colleague. In February 2021, Ellis informed the House of Assembly that he had been charged with offences arising from an investigation by the Independent Commissioner Against Corruption (ICAC) into his use of the Country Members' Accommodation Allowance, which permits regional MPs living more than 75 kilometres from Adelaide to claim up to $234 a night when they are in the city on official business. He was alleged to have made 78 fraudulent claims totalling over $18,000 for nights he did not spend in Adelaide. He was charged with 23 counts of deception, and stated that he denied the allegations and intended to defend the charges.

Following his announcement to parliament, Ann Vanstone, the Independent Commissioner Against Corruption, released a statement confirming that she had referred a brief to the Director of Public Prosecutions in December 2020. Ellis was summonsed to appear in the Adelaide Magistrates Court on 31 March 2021.

Ellis' trial was delayed until June 2022 to allow time for the High Court of Australia to rule on a similar case relating to another South Australian member of parliament, Troy Bell. That meant the case would not be resolved before the 2022 South Australian state election. Because Ellis had voluntarily suspended his own membership of the Liberal Party of South Australia, he announced that he would ask to be endorsed as a Liberal candidate in the election. However, the Liberal Party declined to do so and ran an endorsed candidate against him. Ellis won the seat as an independent against the Liberal-endorsed candidate. In June, Ellis's lawyers sought a permanent stay of proceedings on the grounds that the evidence was "subject to the absolute protection of parliamentary privilege". The application was rejected on 10 August 2022, with his trial set to continue later in the month.

References

External links

 

Members of the South Australian House of Assembly
Year of birth missing (living people)
Living people
Liberal Party of Australia members of the Parliament of South Australia
Independent members of the Parliament of South Australia
21st-century Australian politicians